The 1975 Football Cup of Ukrainian SSR among KFK  was the annual season of Ukraine's football knockout competition for amateur football teams.

Competition schedule

First qualification round

{{OneLegResult|FC Mayak Kharkiv|| 2–0 |FC Suputnyk Poltava}}

|}Notes: The match Hvardiyets – Metalist was awarded 3–0 as a technical result.

Second qualification round

|}

Replay

|}Notes:'''

Quarterfinals (1/4)

|}

Semifinals (1/2)

|}

Final
November 23

|}
Replay (November 24)

|}

See also
 1975 KFK competitions (Ukraine)

External links
 (1975 - 37 чемпионат СССР Кубок Украинской ССР среди КФК) at footbook.ru

Ukrainian Amateur Cup
Ukrainian Amateur Cup
Amateur Cup